Intrinsic happiness may refer to:
 Happiness
 Intrinsic motivation